The North, Central American and Caribbean section of the 1962 FIFA World Cup qualification acted as qualifiers for the 1962 FIFA World Cup in Chile, for national teams which are members of the CCCF and NAFC. Seven teams participated in the tournament to compete for one place in the inter-confederation play-offs against a CONMEBOL team.

Format
The qualification structure was as follows:
First round: Seven teams were divided into three groups (one group of three teams and two groups of two teams) to play home-and-away round-robin matches. The winner of each group advanced to the second round.
Second round: Three teams which had advanced from the first round played home-and-away round-robin matches in one group. The group winner qualified for the CCCF/NAFC–CONMEBOL play-off.

Entrants
Eight national teams from the region initially entered qualification, though Canada later withdrew.

Note: Bolded teams advanced to the inter-confederation play-offs.

First round

Group 1

Group 2

Play-off
Costa Rica and Honduras finished level on points, and a play-off on neutral ground was played to decide who would advance to the second round.

Group 3

Second round

Inter-confederation play-offs

Qualified teams
The following team from CONCACAF qualified for the final tournament.

Goalscorers

Notes

References

External links
 FIFA World Cup Official Site – 1962 World Cup Qualification
 RSSSF – 1962 World Cup Qualification

CONCACAF
FIFA World Cup qualification (CONCACAF)